Navy Secrets is a 1939 American espionage film. Directed by Howard Bretherton, the film stars Fay Wray, Grant Withers, and Dewey Robinson. It was released on February 8, 1939. The screenplay by Harvey Gates was based on the short story "Shore Leave" by Steve Fisher, which was originally published in the August 1938 edition of Hearst's International Cosmopolitan.

Cast list
 Fay Wray as Carol Evans, aka Matthews
 Grant Withers as Steve Roberts, aka Fletcher
 Dewey Robinson as Nick Cilatto
 William Von Brincken as Cronjer
 Craig Reynolds as Jimmy
 George Sorel as Slavins
 André Cheron as Joe Benje
 Robert Frazer as Peter
 Joseph Crehan as Daly
 Duke York as Babe

References

American black-and-white films
American adventure films
1939 adventure films
1939 films
Monogram Pictures films
1930s English-language films
1930s American films